A Break with Charity: A Story about the Salem Witch Trials is a novel by Ann Rinaldi released in 1992, and is part of the Great Episodes series.

Plot synopsis 
The story begins with a girl named Susanna English. She is the second child of three, Mary and her brother at sea, William. She desperately wants to join an inner circle of girls who meet every night at the Reverend's house. The leader of the girls, Ann Putnam, is going to set off a torrent of false accusations leading to the imprisonment of innocent people in Salem. She names people her mother disliked as witches, and the elders of Salem believe them. Ann tells Susanna everything about their plan, but if Susanna tells anyone, Ann will name Susanna's parents as witches. Susanna must choose between keeping quiet and breaking charity (that is, telling tales), risking her family being named as witches. Later on, the afflicted girls accuse Susanna's mother and father of being witches, even though she told no one about what Ann said to her. Susanna then starts to believe in witches until her future husband, Johnathon gets her to meet an accused witch so she can see they are fake. She finally tells Joseph, Ann's uncle, leader of the "non-witch 'believers" what she knows, and together, they put a stop to it with help from powerful people (like magistrates). Fourteen years later she returns to hear Ann Putnam apologize for all the innocent people imprisoned, or hanged. This story is based on true happenings of 1692.

See also
 Salem witch trials

1992 American novels
1992 children's books
American children's novels
American historical novels
Children's historical novels
Novels by Ann Rinaldi
Novels set in the 1690s
Salem witch trials in fiction